"Lalisa" (stylized in all caps) is the debut solo single by Thai rapper and singer Lisa, a member of South Korean girl group Blackpink. It was released by YG Entertainment on September 10, 2021 as the lead single from her debut single album of the same name. Written and produced by long-time YG collaborator Teddy Park, along with Bekuh Boom and 24, "Lalisa" is characterized as a dynamic hip hop track taking influence from Thai culture.

Commercially, "Lalisa" entered the US Billboard Hot 100 at number 84 and peaked at number two on the Billboard Global 200, becoming Lisa's first top-ten hit on the chart. An accompanying music video was simultaneously uploaded to Blackpink's YouTube channel with the single's release; the video received 73.6 million views within 24 hours, becoming the most-viewed music video in a single day from a soloist on the platform. Upon its release, "Lalisa" received criticism for its lyrics and composition; however, Lisa herself was praised for her charisma and quality of performance. The song won Best K-Pop at the 2022 MTV Video Music Awards, making Lisa the first K-pop soloist ever to win an MTV Video Music Award.

Background and release
Following the release of bandmate Rosés debut single album R in March 2021, attention towards Lisa surfaced as the next member to debut as a solo artist. In an article published by The Korea Herald on April 19, a representative from YG Entertainment revealed that Lisa would debut as the third soloist from her group with schedules to be officially announced through a notice later in the year. On July 25, Lisa uploaded two images featuring herself in a studio onto her Instagram stories with the caption "What's my name?", hinting at the title of her upcoming release. On August 25, YG confirmed that her solo debut single album would be titled Lalisa, after her given name; the agency subsequently unveiled the track-listing for the album, revealing that the single of the same name would serve as the title track. The song was released on September 10, 2021, and was made available for digital download and streaming. The track was written and produced by long-time Blackpink collaborators Teddy Park and Bekuh Boom, with additional production credits by 24.

Music and lyrics
Stylistically, it is characterized as a dynamic hip hop and EDM track that infuses Thai elements in the song's dance break. The track's production utilizes "provocative" brass riffs and dynamic rhythms that are reminiscent of sounds of sirens, and incorporates the repetition of 'Lalisa' in the lyrics. In terms of musical notation, the song is composed in the key of E-flat major and carries a tempo of 150 beats per minute. The name of the single album along with its title track is a reference to her given name she received upon visiting a fortune teller while she was young as a gesture for good luck. The week after changing her name, YG Entertainment informed her that they have accepted her into the agency as a trainee. Nolan Feeney from Billboard magazine noted that the "title track expands on the maximalist, globe-trotting sound of Blackpink bangers like 'How You Like That' with rapid-fire flows and nods to her Thai heritage".

Critical reception
Most critics were unfavorable towards the song's composition and lyrical content while praising Lisa's performance. Writing for The Harvard Crimson, Allison S. Park stated that Lisa's "formidable rapping skills shine through" but criticized the "absence of a cohesive lyrical narrative." In a negative review, Rhian Daly of NME asserted that "instead of being the shining, swaggering triumph you might expect, its quality is disappointingly low." Referring to the track as "awkward", she also felt that the lyrical content contained no  "heart or soul" and instead focused more on "empty brags" which did not reach its intended effect. In a similar review, Park Soo-jin of IZM pointed the song "fully conveys her identity as a Thai and shouts about musician Lisa's dignity here and there, but it's not very impressive." Park added that success of the song didn't came "from the perfection of the song, but from the brand power that began with Blackpink and 'inside' Lisa." On a more positive note, Chase McMullen of Beats Per Minute said that "it's Lisa's performance that deftly takes main stage, with her flipping through the song's numerous changes with such smoothness as to make each component feel perfectly natural." Writing for Teen Vogue, Erica Gerald Mason observed that Lisa "hits every musical and creative note as she sings, raps, and dances."

Year-end lists

Commercial performance
"Lalisa" debuted at number two on the Billboard Global 200 and Global Excl. U.S., marking Lisa's first solo entry and top-ten song on the chart. It achieved 152.6 million streams globally in its debut week, earning the biggest worldwide weekly streaming total by a soloist and the fourth-biggest in the chart's history. The song charted on the Global 200 for 10 weeks and the Global Excl. U.S. for 13 weeks, tying for the longest-charting song by a K-pop soloist until overtaken by Lisa's single "Money". In South Korea, the song debuted at number 90 on the Gaon Digital Chart on the week dated September 5–11, with less than two days of tracking. The following week, the song rose to a peak at number 64. The song also debuted at number 28 on the Billboard K-pop Hot 100. The song peaked at number one in Malaysia and number two in Singapore.

In the United States, "Lalisa" debuted at number 84 on the Billboard Hot 100 and at number six on the Digital Song Sales chart with 9,600 digital copies sold in its first week, giving Lisa two top-ten hits on the latter chart alongside "Money". The song also debuted atop the US Billboard World Digital Song Sales chart, her first chart-topper as a soloist. In the United Kingdom, "Lalisa" debuted at number 68 on the UK Singles Chart and at number 13 on the UK Singles Downloads Chart. In Canada, the song debuted at number 42 on the Canadian Hot 100 and at number seven on the Canadian Digital Song Sales chart.

Music video

An accompanying music video for the song was uploaded to Blackpink's YouTube channel in conjunction with the release of "Lalisa"; the video was preceded with a teaser—which was released via the same platform three days earlier. The music video became the most-viewed debut video and the most-viewed video by a soloist in 24 hours, garnering 73.6 million views; the video broke the records of Rosé's "On the Ground" and Taylor Swift's "Me!" featuring Brendon Urie, which received 41.6 million views and 65.2 million views in 24 hours, respectively. The music video surpassed 100 million views in 49 hours, 200 million views in 13 days, and 300 million views in 48 days, the fastest to reach these marks by any K-pop female solo artist.

The visual includes numerous costume changes, including an intricate ensemble based on traditional Thai culture. Lisa sits on an elaborately-sculpted throne donning a golden beaded dress and cape, earcuffs with golden jasmines, and a tall pointed headdress called "rad klao yod" (รัดเกล้ายอด in Thai) that is worn mainly in traditional dance forms. After the music video was released, the sale of traditional outfits surged at a popular market in the Thai capital, Bangkok. The Phanom Rung temple that was depicted in the music video in Buriram also increased in visitors. Thailand's Prime Minister Prayut Chan-o-cha commended Lisa among Thai artists whose work reflects a dedication to inspire Thais in creative industries and expressed interest in promoting Thailand’s soft power following the success of "Lalisa".

Live performances and promotion
Following the release of her single album on September 10, Lisa debuted the title track the same day on The Tonight Show Starring Jimmy Fallon. The title track's choreography was choreographed by Kiel Tutin, Sienna Lalau and Lee-jung Lee. On September 19, she performed "Lalisa" on SBS's Inkigayo, marking her solo debut on South Korean television. Lisa performed the song on MBC's Show! Music Core on September 25 and again on SBS's Inkigayo on September 26.

Accolades

Credits
 Lalisa Manoballead vocals
 Teddy Parklyricist, composer
 Bekuh Boomcomposer, lyricist
 24composer, arranger

Charts

Weekly charts

Monthly charts

Year-end charts

Release history

See also 
 List of K-pop songs on the Billboard charts
 List of most-viewed online videos in the first 24 hours
 List of Music Bank Chart winners (2021)
 List of number-one songs of 2021 (Malaysia)

Notes

References

2021 songs
2021 debut singles
Interscope Records singles
Lisa (rapper) songs
Number-one singles in Malaysia
Songs written by Teddy Park
YG Entertainment singles